The 2006 Categoría Primera A season is the 59th season of Colombia's top-flight football league.

Campeonato Apertura 
The Copa Mustang I 2006 was the first tournament of the 2006 season of Fútbol Profesional Colombiano, first division in Colombian football. The new season started in Saturday February 4 and finished Sunday June 25.

Tournament Fixtures

Standings 

 Pts=Puntos; GP=Games played; W=Wins; D=Draw; L=Lost; GF=Goals Favored; GA=Goals Allowed; DIF=Difference

Results

Semifinals Group Stage 

The second phase of the 2006 tournament consisted of two groups of 4 teams semifinals. This was disputed by the best eight teams from the first phase of the tournament. the winners of each group will face on the finals to define a champion.

Group A

Group B

Final

Campeonato Finalización 
2006-II - Copa Mustang or Torneo Finalización 2006 was the 64th installment of the Mustang Cup. It began on the night of July 15, 2006 with the opening match between Atlético Nacional and Cúcuta Deportivo in Medellín at the stadium Estadio Atanasio Girardot. 18 teams compete against one another and played each weekend until November 12. At that point, the top 8 teams in the league stage advanced to the group stage, each group with 4 teams. From that point on the teams play on a home and away basis, for a total of a six matches each. The winner of both groups at the end advance to the home-and-away final.

In the league stage, last year's Finalización champions Deportivo Cali were knocked out after a last-round defeat to Independiente Medellín, while Envigado FC were relegated to Primera B after losing 12 of their 18 games, thus ending with the worst point average. América de Cali played its worst season, losing 11 matches and struggling at the bottom of the table.

The Group Stage saw Deportes Tolima getting a dramatic 2–1 win over Atlético Nacional thus becoming leaders of Group A while in Group B, Independiente Medellín thrashed Millonarios 4–0 in the Estadio Atanasio Girardot only to learn that Cúcuta Deportivo and Atlético Huila tied 0-0. The champions were Cúcuta Deportivo defeating Deportes Tolima in the finals with the total aggregate score of 2-1 from two matches.

Schedule

Standings 
Standings until November 16, 2006

 Pts=Points; GP=Games played; W=Wins; D=Ties; L=Losses; GS=Goals scored; GA=Goals allowed; DIF=Goal difference

Results

Quadrangular/Semifinals 

The second phase of the 2006-II Copa Mustang consisted of the quadrangular phase or semifinals. It was played between the best first eight teams from the tournament's standing, and then it was divided in two groups between odd and even numbers. The first team of each group were qualified directly to the finals, and then deciding a champion.

Group A

Group B

Final

Promotion Game 

After the 2006 season of Fútbol Profesional Colombiano ended, Envigado FC was relegated directly to Categoría Primera B while Atlético Huila played the promotion game against Valledupar FC.

Relegated and Promoted Team(s)

References

External links 
 Copa Mustang Official Page
 Dimayor Official Page

Categoría Primera A seasons
Colombia
1